Area 2 can refer to:

 Brodmann area 2
 Area 2 (Nevada National Security Site)